What Is Father Doing in Italy? is a 1961 West German musical comedy film directed by  and starring Willy Fritsch, Gerhard Riedmann and Peter Kraus. It was shot in Agfacolor.

Cast

References

Bibliography 
 Bock, Hans-Michael & Bergfelder, Tim. The Concise CineGraph. Encyclopedia of German Cinema. Berghahn Books, 2009.

External links 
 

1961 films
1961 musical comedy films
1961 romantic comedy films
German musical comedy films
German romantic comedy films
West German films
1960s German-language films
Films set in Italy
Constantin Film films
1960s German films